This list is of the Cultural Properties of Japan designated in the category of  for the Prefecture of Mie.

National Cultural Properties
As of 1 March 2015, eighteen Important Cultural Properties have been designated, being of national significance.

Prefectural Cultural Properties
Forty-three properties have been designated at a prefectural level.

See also
 Cultural Properties of Japan
 List of National Treasures of Japan (paintings)
 List of Cultural Properties of Japan - historical materials (Mie)
 Japanese painting

References

External links
  Cultural Properties in Mie Prefecture

Cultural Properties,Mie
Cultural Properties,Paintings
Paintings,Mie
Lists of paintings